Willow Springs is an unincorporated community in northeastern Fayette County, Texas, United States.

It has been named Zapp, Rock House, and German Settlement.

External links
 WILLOW SPRINGS, TX (Fayette County) Handbook of Texas Online.

Unincorporated communities in Fayette County, Texas
Unincorporated communities in Texas